This is the discography of American rapper Masta Killa.

Studio albums

Live albums

Compilation albums

Singles

Guest appearances

References

External links 
 Masta Killa's Myspace
 Masta Killa Biography

Discographies of American artists
Hip hop discographies